Wim Tap (3 October 1903 – 24 September 1979) was a Dutch footballer who played club football for ADO Den Haag. He also earned 33 caps for the Dutch national side between 1925 and 1931, scoring 17 goals. He was also part of the Netherlands squad at the 1928 Summer Olympics, but did not play in any matches.

References

External links
  

1903 births
1979 deaths
Dutch footballers
Netherlands international footballers
Olympic footballers of the Netherlands
Footballers at the 1928 Summer Olympics
ADO Den Haag players
Footballers from The Hague
Dutch football managers
ADO Den Haag managers
Association football forwards